Hinsley is a surname of English origin. People with that name include:

 Arthur Hinsley (1865–1943), English prelate of the Roman Catholic Church
 David Hinsley, former member of the Canadian band Faber Drive
 F. B. Hinsley (1900–1988), English mining engineer
 George Hinsley (1914–1989), English footballer
 Harry Hinsley (1918–1998), English historian and cryptanalyst
 Jerry Hinsley (born 1945), American former professional baseball player

See also
 Newman Catholic College (formerly Cardinal Hinsley Maths and Computing College), an all-boys Catholic school located in the London Borough of Brent
 

Surnames of English origin